Agyneta laimonasi is a species of sheet weaver found in Russia. It was described by Tanasevitch in 2006.

References

laimonasi
Spiders described in 2006
Spiders of Russia